The 1847 Hamilton municipal election was the first election held to the newly incorporated Town of Hamilton. The vote was held on January 12, 1847 to select ten members to represent each of the city's five wards on the Hamilton, Ontario, City Council. Those councillors would, in turn, elect one mayor from their ranks and an additional councillor to represent the seat they vacated on Saturday, January 16, 1847.

Mayoral Election

The first council of the City of Hamilton met on Saturday, 16 January 1847, to elect a mayor from among their ranks. The Hamilton Spectator and Journal of Commerce reported that "after some discussion", St. Mary's ward councillor Colin Ferrie was proposed and a vote was held, where only one councillor voted against Ferrie's assuming the office. Following the election of Ferrie as mayor, councillors selected Alexander Carpenter as Ferrie's replacement on city council.

|-
!rowspan="2" colspan="2"|Candidate
!rowspan="2" colspan="1"|Affiliation
!colspan="2"|Council vote
!rowspan="2"| Elected?
|-
! For
! Against
|-

| style="text-align:left;" | Colin Ferrie
| style="text-align:right;" | Independent
| style="text-align:right;" |9
| style="text-align:right;" |1
| style="text-align:center;" |
|-
| style="text-align:right;background-color:#FFFFFF;" colspan="3" |Total votes
| style="text-align:right;background-color:#FFFFFF;" colspan="1" |10
| style="text-align:right;background-color:#FFFFFF;" colspan="1" |
|- 
| style="text-align:left;" colspan="6" |Note: The mayor was elected by councillors from among their ranks.
|- 
| style="text-align:left;" colspan="13" |Sources: 
|}

Councillors

St. Andrew's Ward

|-
!rowspan="2" colspan="2"|Candidate
!rowspan="2" colspan="1"|Affiliation
!colspan="1"|Popular vote
!rowspan="2"| Elected?
|-
! Votes
|-

| style="text-align:left;" | H.B. Wilson
| style="text-align:right;" | Independent
| style="text-align:right;" |156
| style="text-align:center;" |
|-

| style="text-align:left;" | (?) Gunn
| style="text-align:right;" | Independent
| style="text-align:right;" |126
| style="text-align:center;" |
|-

| style="text-align:left;" | Thomas Gillesby
| style="text-align:right;" | Independent
| style="text-align:right;" |59
| style="text-align:center;" |
|-
| style="text-align:right;background-color:#FFFFFF;" colspan="3" |Total votes
| style="text-align:right;background-color:#FFFFFF;" colspan="1" |
| style="text-align:right;background-color:#FFFFFF;" colspan="1" |
|- 
| style="text-align:right;background-color:#FFFFFF;" colspan="3" |Registered voters
| style="text-align:right;background-color:#FFFFFF;" |
| style="text-align:right;background-color:#FFFFFF;" colspan="1" |
|- 
| style="text-align:left;" colspan="6" |Note: Candidate campaign colours are used as a visual differentiation between candidates and to indicate affiliation.
|- 
| style="text-align:left;" colspan="13" |Sources: 
|}

St. George's Ward

|-
!rowspan="2" colspan="2"|Candidate
!rowspan="2" colspan="1"|Affiliation
!colspan="1"|Popular vote
!rowspan="2"| Elected?
|-
! Votes
|-

| style="text-align:left;" | (?) Freeman
| style="text-align:right;" | Independent
| style="text-align:right;" |86
| style="text-align:center;" |
|-

| style="text-align:left;" | (?) Mills
| style="text-align:right;" | Independent
| style="text-align:right;" |84
| style="text-align:center;" |
|-

| style="text-align:left;" | (?) Walker
| style="text-align:right;" | Independent
| style="text-align:right;" |39
| style="text-align:center;" |
|-
| style="text-align:right;background-color:#FFFFFF;" colspan="3" |Total votes
| style="text-align:right;background-color:#FFFFFF;" colspan="1" |
| style="text-align:right;background-color:#FFFFFF;" colspan="1" |
|- 
| style="text-align:right;background-color:#FFFFFF;" colspan="3" |Registered voters
| style="text-align:right;background-color:#FFFFFF;" |
| style="text-align:right;background-color:#FFFFFF;" colspan="1" |
|- 
| style="text-align:left;" colspan="6" |Note: Candidate campaign colours are used as a visual differentiation between candidates and to indicate affiliation.
|- 
| style="text-align:left;" colspan="13" |Sources: 
|}

St. Patrick's Ward

|-
!rowspan="2" colspan="2"|Candidate
!rowspan="2" colspan="1"|Affiliation
!colspan="1"|Popular vote
!rowspan="2"| Elected?
|-
! Votes
|-

| style="text-align:left;" | (?) Kelly
| style="text-align:right;" | Independent
| style="text-align:right;" |131
| style="text-align:center;" |
|-

| style="text-align:left;" | (?) O'Reilly
| style="text-align:right;" | Independent
| style="text-align:right;" |107
| style="text-align:center;" |
|-

| style="text-align:left;" | (?) Clemeat
| style="text-align:right;" | Independent
| style="text-align:right;" |86
| style="text-align:center;" |
|-
| style="text-align:right;background-color:#FFFFFF;" colspan="3" |Total votes
| style="text-align:right;background-color:#FFFFFF;" colspan="1" |
| style="text-align:right;background-color:#FFFFFF;" colspan="1" |
|- 
| style="text-align:right;background-color:#FFFFFF;" colspan="3" |Registered voters
| style="text-align:right;background-color:#FFFFFF;" |
| style="text-align:right;background-color:#FFFFFF;" colspan="1" |
|- 
| style="text-align:left;" colspan="6" |Note: Candidate campaign colours are used as a visual differentiation between candidates and to indicate affiliation.
|- 
| style="text-align:left;" colspan="13" |Sources:  
|}

St. Lawrence Ward

|-
!rowspan="2" colspan="2"|Candidate
!rowspan="2" colspan="1"|Affiliation
!colspan="1"|Popular vote
!rowspan="2"| Elected?
|-
! Votes
|-

| style="text-align:left;" | (?) Ford
| style="text-align:right;" | Independent
| style="text-align:right;" |113
| style="text-align:center;" |
|-

| style="text-align:left;" | (?) Counsel
| style="text-align:right;" | Independent
| style="text-align:right;" |75
| style="text-align:center;" |
|-

| style="text-align:left;" | (?) Winer
| style="text-align:right;" | Independent
| style="text-align:right;" |71
| style="text-align:center;" |
|-
| style="text-align:right;background-color:#FFFFFF;" colspan="3" |Total votes
| style="text-align:right;background-color:#FFFFFF;" colspan="1" |
| style="text-align:right;background-color:#FFFFFF;" colspan="1" |
|- 
| style="text-align:right;background-color:#FFFFFF;" colspan="3" |Registered voters
| style="text-align:right;background-color:#FFFFFF;" |
| style="text-align:right;background-color:#FFFFFF;" colspan="1" |
|- 
| style="text-align:left;" colspan="6" |Note: Candidate campaign colours are used as a visual differentiation between candidates and to indicate affiliation.
|- 
| style="text-align:left;" colspan="13" |Sources: 
|}

St. Mary's Ward

|-
!rowspan="2" colspan="2"|Candidate
!rowspan="2" colspan="1"|Affiliation
!colspan="1"|Popular vote
!rowspan="2"| Elected?
|-
! Votes
|-

| style="text-align:left;" | Colin Ferrie
| style="text-align:right;" | Independent
| style="text-align:right;" |110
| style="text-align:center;" |
|-

| style="text-align:left;" | Andrew "Yankee" Miller
| style="text-align:right;" | Independent
| style="text-align:right;" |88
| style="text-align:center;" |
|-

| style="text-align:left;" | (?) Webster
| style="text-align:right;" | Independent
| style="text-align:right;" |68
| style="text-align:center;" |
|-
| style="text-align:right;background-color:#FFFFFF;" colspan="3" |Total votes
| style="text-align:right;background-color:#FFFFFF;" colspan="1" |
| style="text-align:right;background-color:#FFFFFF;" colspan="1" |
|- 
| style="text-align:right;background-color:#FFFFFF;" colspan="3" |Registered voters
| style="text-align:right;background-color:#FFFFFF;" |
| style="text-align:right;background-color:#FFFFFF;" colspan="1" |
|- 
| style="text-align:left;" colspan="6" |Note: Candidate campaign colours are used as a visual differentiation between candidates and to indicate affiliation.
|- 
| style="text-align:left;" colspan="13" |Sources: 
|}

References

Municipal elections in Hamilton, Ontario
January 1847 events
1847 elections in Canada